Polovina is a rural locality (a village) in Vakhnevskoye Rural Settlement, Nikolsky District, Vologda Oblast, Russia. The population was 38 as of 2002.

Geography 
Polovina is located 52 km northwest of Nikolsk (the district's administrative centre) by road. Orlovo is the nearest rural locality.

References 

Rural localities in Nikolsky District, Vologda Oblast